Burro is a 1989  Italian comedy-drama film written by Tonino Guerra and directed by José María Sánchez.

Plot  
The film tells the story of Burro, a boy from Romagna who works in the small cinema of his country. He falls in love with a big screen actress he sees in every woman he meets. With her he will have three "meetings". In the last, the woman will be a gypsy who points out to him the dead father in a dog.

Cast 
 Renato Pozzetto as Burro
 Elena Sofia Ricci as Katarina
 Margarita Lozano as Burro's mother
 Pierre Malet as the film actor
 Victor Cavallo as the priest
 Teodoro Corrà as Mustafà

See also        
 List of Italian films of 1989

References

External links

Italian comedy-drama films
1989 comedy-drama films
Films scored by Luis Bacalov
Films with screenplays by Tonino Guerra
1989 crime drama films
1989 films
1980s Italian-language films
1980s Italian films